The red-capped crombec (Sylvietta ruficapilla) is a species of African warbler, formerly placed in the family Sylviidae.

Range
It is found in Angola, Republic of the Congo, the DRC, Malawi, Mozambique, Tanzania, Zambia, Zimbabwe, and possibly Botswana.

Habitat
Its natural habitats are subtropical or tropical dry forests, subtropical or tropical dry shrubland, and subtropical or tropical moist shrubland.

References

red-capped crombec
Birds of Central Africa
Birds of Southern Africa
red-capped crombec
Taxonomy articles created by Polbot